Geraniol isomerase is an enzyme with systematic name geraniol hydroxymutase. This enzyme catalyses the following chemical reaction

 geraniol  (3S)-linalool

In absence of oxygen the bifunctional linalool dehydratase-isomerase could act as an enzyme from this class.

References

External links 
 

EC 5.4.4